Intercontinental de Aviación Flight 256 (RS256/ICT256) was a scheduled flight from El Dorado International Airport, Bogotá, on a service to Rafael Núñez International Airport, Cartagena, and San Andrés. On 11 January 1995, the McDonnell Douglas DC-9-14 operating the flight crashed during its approach to Cartagena Airport, killing all but one of the 51 people on board. The sole survivor was a nine-year old girl who sustained minor injuries.

Aircraft and crew 
The aircraft involved was a McDonnell Douglas DC-9-14 (serial number - 45742, manufacturing serial number - 26) that had its maiden flight on 15 February 1966 and was initially registered as N8901E. The aircraft was initially powered by two Pratt & Whitney JT8D-7A engines, which developed 12,600 pounds of thrust. The plane was delivered to Eastern Air Lines on 26 April the same year. On 27 April 1970, the aircraft was leased to Delta Air Lines, and was returned to Eastern on 23 April 1971. On May 31, 1979, the aircraft was transferred to Texas International Airlines, which merged into Continental Airlines in 1982. On 31 October the same year, Continental Airlines named the aircraft City of Mexico City. Also in the latter the engines were upgraded, which were modified to the model JT8D-7B. Also, the configuration of the cabin of the aircraft was changed to 83 seats (8 first-class seats and 75 economy-class seats). The aircraft remained registered as N8901E. On 29 April 1993, the aircraft was transferred to  Intercontinental de Aviación, where the aircraft was re-registered as HK-3839X. The aircraft was almost 29 years old and had 65,084 flight hours and 69,716 take-off and landing cycles at the time of the crash.

The captain of flight 256 was Andrés Patacón (39), and the first officer was Luis Ríos (36). In the cabin there were three flight attendants: Claudia Duarte, Dalia Mora and Zaida Tarazona. On board were 47 passengers, all of whom were Colombians.

Crash 
The flight was scheduled to depart at 12:10 but was delayed due to a failure on the previous flight. The flight eventually departed at 18:45. The aircraft climbed to flight level (FL) 310 at 19:09.

During the approach to Cartagena, the air traffic control center in Barranquilla cleared flight 256 to descend to FL 140 and report when passing  FL 200 at 19:26. The aircraft passed through FL 200 at 19:33.

At 19:38, the crew of a Cessna Caravan aircraft, who were operating flight 209 from Aerocorales, contacted the controllers. The crew reported that they had seen the lights of a rapidly descending aircraft, followed by an explosion on the ground. The plane impacted with the ground in a marshy lagoon near María La Baja,  from Cartagena Airport. The plane exploded on impact and broke into three parts. 51 people were killed: 46 out of the 47 passengers and all 5 crew members.

The sole survivor of the crash was a nine-year-old girl named Erika Delgado. She was flying with her parents and younger brother, who were killed in the crash. The girl's injuries were just a few bumps and bruises, most serious being a broken arm. She stated that her mother survived the initial impact and pushed her aside into a vegetable pile to shield her away from the fire. The girl was found by one of the local residents who came running to the rescue. She explained that there was looting at the crash site and that one of the looters stole a necklace which was given to her by her father. The looting was later confirmed, and the girl asked that the necklace be returned to her, but this was unsuccessful.

Investigation 
Since the crew of the Cessna reported an explosion, first suspicions arose about a terrorist attack, similar to the bombing of Avianca Flight 203 in 1989. However, investigators determined that the plane exploded when it hit the ground, and no traces of explosives were found. The probable cause of the crash was a wrong setting of the altimeter. Altimeter number 1 indicated  on impact. Altimeter number 2 (the first officer's) worked normally, but its lights did not work, and therefore the crew could not compare their readings. Other contributing factors were the lack of radar observation in the area and the flight crew's loss of situational awareness (due to the clear weather relaxing them), as well as the airline's insufficient training of crews in this situation. In addition, it was not possible to determine whether the ground proximity warning system functioned properly, or if the crew was unable to respond to it in time, as the cockpit voice recorder was inoperative at the time of the accident.

References

External links
 Aerocivil
 Final report (Archive)
  Summary (Archive)
 Aviation Safety Network
 Accident description

Accidents and incidents involving the McDonnell Douglas DC-9
Aviation accidents and incidents involving controlled flight into terrain
Aviation accidents and incidents in Colombia
Aviation accidents and incidents in 1995
January 1995 events in South America
1995 in Colombia
Airliner accidents and incidents caused by instrument failure
Airliner accidents and incidents caused by pilot error